Mold health issues refer to the harmful health effects of moulds ("molds" in American English) and their mycotoxins. However, recent research has shown these adverse health effects are caused not exclusively by molds, but also other microbial agents and biotoxins associated with dampness, mold, and water-damaged buildings, such as gram-negative bacteria that produce endotoxins, as well as actinomycetes and their associated exotoxins. Approximately 47% of houses in the United States have substantial levels of mold, with over 85% of commercial and office buildings found to have water damage predictive of mold. As many as 21% of asthma cases may result from exposure to mold. Substantial and statistically significant increases in the risks of both respiratory infections and bronchitis have been associated with dampness in homes and the resulting mold.

Molds and many related microbial agents are ubiquitous in the biosphere, and mold spores are a common component of household and workplace dust. While the most molds in the outdoor environment are not hazardous to humans, many found inside buildings are known to be. Reaction to molds can vary between individuals, from relatively minor allergic reactions through to severe multi-system inflammatory effects, neurological problems, and death. The United States Centers for Disease Control and Prevention (CDC) reported in its June 2006 report, 'Mold Prevention Strategies and Possible Health Effects in the Aftermath of Hurricanes and Major Floods,' that "excessive exposure to mold-contaminated materials can cause adverse health effects in susceptible persons regardless of the type of mold or the extent of contamination." Mold spores and associated toxins can cause harm primarily via inhalation, ingestion, and contact. In higher quantities such as those found in water-damaged buildings, they can present especially hazardous health risks to humans after sufficient exposure, with three generally accepted mechanisms of harm and a fourth probable mechanism:

 Allergic reactions, including allergic bronchopulmonary aspergillosis
 Invasive mold infections (mycosis)
 Toxicity (poisoning by mycotoxins)
 Innate immune dysfunction.

Health effects

Studies have shown that people who are atopic (sensitive), already have allergies, asthma, or compromised immune systems and occupy damp or moldy buildings are at an increased risk of health problems such as inflammatory responses to mold spores, metabolites such as mycotoxins, and other components. Other problems are respiratory and/or immune system responses including respiratory symptoms, respiratory infections, exacerbation of asthma, and rarely hypersensitivity pneumonitis, allergic alveolitis, chronic rhinosinusitis and allergic fungal sinusitis. A person's reaction to mold depends on their sensitivity and other health conditions, the amount of mold present, length of exposure, and the type of mold or mold products.

Some molds also produce mycotoxins, which, in sufficient quantity, can pose serious health risks to humans and animals. The colloquial term "toxic mold" (or more accurately, toxigenic mold) refers to molds that produce mycotoxins known to harm humans, not to all molds.  Exposure to high levels of mycotoxins can lead to neurological problems and, in some cases, death. Prolonged exposure, e.g., daily workplace exposure, can be particularly harmful.

The five most common genera of indoor molds are Cladosporium, Penicillium, Aspergillus, Alternaria, and Trichoderma.

Damp environments that allow mold to grow can also allow the proliferation of bacteria and release volatile organic compounds.

Symptoms of mold exposure

Symptoms of mold exposure can include:
 Nasal and sinus congestion, runny nose
 Respiratory problems, such as wheezing and difficulty breathing, chest tightness
 Cough
 Throat irritation
 Sneezing / Sneezing fits

Health effects linking to asthma 
Adverse respiratory health effects are associated with occupancy in buildings with moisture and mold damage. Infants may develop respiratory symptoms due to exposure to a specific type of fungal mold, called Penicillium. Signs that an infant may have mold-related respiratory problems include (but are not limited to) a persistent cough and wheeze. Increased exposure increases the probability of developing respiratory symptoms during their first year of life.  Studies have shown that a correlation exists between the probability of developing asthma and increased exposure to Penicillium. The levels are deemed 'no mold'  to 'low level', from 'low'  to 'intermediate', and 'intermediate'  to 'high'.

Mold exposures have a variety of health effects depending on the person. Some people are more sensitive to mold than others. Exposure to mold can cause several health issues such as; throat irritation, nasal stuffiness, eye irritation, cough, and wheezing, as well as skin irritation in some cases.  Exposure to mold may also cause heightened sensitivity depending on the time and nature of exposure.  People at higher risk for mold allergies are people with chronic lung illnesses and weak immune systems, which can often result in more severe reactions when exposed to mold.

There has been sufficient evidence that damp indoor environments are correlated with upper respiratory tract symptoms such as coughing, and wheezing in people with asthma.

Flood-specific mold health effects
Among children and adolescents, the most common health effect post-flooding was lower respiratory tract symptoms, though there was a lack of association with measurements of total fungi. Another study found that these respiratory symptoms were positively associated with exposure to water damaged homes, exposure included being inside without participating in clean up.  Despite lower respiratory effects among all children, there was a significant difference in health outcomes between children with pre-existing conditions and children without.  Children with pre-existing conditions were at greater risk that can likely be attributed to the greater disruption of care in the face of flooding and natural disaster.

Although mold is the primary focus post flooding for residents, the effects of dampness alone must also be considered. According to the Institute of Medicine, there is a significant association between dampness in the home and wheeze, cough, and upper respiratory symptoms. A later analysis determined that 30% to 50% of asthma-related health outcomes are associated with not only mold, but also dampness in buildings. Another health effect associated with dampness and mold is Sick Building Syndrome (SBS), which is defined by manifestations of symptomatic illness as a result of poor indoor air quality and pollutant exposures. Signs of potentially illness-causing buildings include condensation on the windows, high humidity in the bathrooms, a moldy odor, or water leakage.

While there is a proven correlation between mold exposure and the development of upper and lower respiratory syndromes, there are still fewer incidences of negative health effects than one might expect.  Barbeau and colleagues suggested that studies do not show a greater impact from mold exposure for several reasons: 1) the types of health effects are not severe and are therefore not caught; 2) people whose homes have flooded find alternative housing to prevent exposure; 3) self-selection, the healthier people participated in mold clean-up and were less likely to get sick; 4) exposures were time-limited as result of remediation efforts and; 5) the lack of access to health care post-flooding may result in fewer illnesses being discovered and reported for their association with mold. There are also certain notable scientific limitations in studying the exposure effects of dampness and molds on individuals because there are currently no known biomarkers that can prove that a person was exclusively exposed to molds. Thus, it is currently impossible to prove correlation between mold exposure and symptoms.

Mold-associated conditions 
Health problems associated with high levels of airborne mold spores include allergic reactions, asthma episodes, irritations of the eye, nose and throat, sinus congestion, and other respiratory problems. Several studies and reviews have suggested that childhood exposure to dampness and mold might contribute to the development of asthma. For example, residents of homes with mold are at an elevated risk for both respiratory infections and bronchitis. When mold spores are inhaled by an immunocompromised individual, some mold spores may begin to grow on living tissue, attaching to cells along the respiratory tract and causing further problems.  Generally, when this occurs, the illness is an epiphenomenon and not the primary pathology. Also, mold may produce mycotoxins, either before or after exposure to humans, potentially causing toxicity.

Fungal infection

A serious health threat from mold exposure for immunocompromised individuals is systemic fungal infection (systemic mycosis). Immunocompromised individuals exposed to high levels of mold, or individuals with chronic exposure may become infected. Sinuses and digestive tract infections are most common; lung and skin infections are also possible. Mycotoxins may or may not be produced by the invading mold.

Dermatophytes are the parasitic fungi that cause skin infections such as athlete's foot and tinea cruris. Most dermatophyte fungi take the form of mold, as opposed to a yeast, with an appearance (when cultured) that is similar to other molds.

Opportunistic infection by molds such as Talaromyces marneffei and Aspergillus fumigatus is a common cause of illness and death among immunocompromised people, including people with AIDS or asthma.

Mold-induced hypersensitivity
The most common form of hypersensitivity is caused by the direct exposure to inhaled mold spores that can be dead or alive or hyphal fragments which can lead to allergic asthma or allergic rhinitis.  The most common effects are rhinorrhea (runny nose), watery eyes, coughing and asthma attacks.  Another form of hypersensitivity is hypersensitivity pneumonitis.  Exposure can occur at home, at work or in other settings.   It is predicted that about 5% of people have some airway symptoms due to allergic reactions to molds in their lifetimes.

Hypersensitivity may also be a reaction toward an established fungal infection in allergic bronchopulmonary aspergillosis.

Mycotoxin toxicity

Molds excrete toxic compounds called mycotoxins, secondary metabolites produced by fungi under certain environmental conditions. These environmental conditions affect the production of mycotoxins at the transcription level. Temperature, water activity and pH, strongly influence mycotoxin biosynthesis by increasing the level of transcription within the fungal spore. It has also been found that low levels of fungicides can boost mycotoxin synthesis. Certain mycotoxins can be harmful or lethal to humans and animals when exposure is high enough.

Extreme exposure to very high levels of mycotoxins can lead to neurological problems and, in some cases, death; fortunately, such exposures rarely to never occur in normal exposure scenarios, even in residences with serious mold problems. Prolonged exposure, such as daily workplace exposure, can be particularly harmful.

It is thought that all molds may produce mycotoxins, and thus all molds may be potentially toxic if large enough quantities are ingested, or the human becomes exposed to extreme quantities of mold. Mycotoxins are not produced all the time, but only under specific growing conditions. Mycotoxins are harmful or lethal to humans and animals only when exposure is high enough.

Mycotoxins can be found on the mold spore and mold fragments, and therefore they can also be found on the substrate upon which the mold grows.  Routes of entry for these insults can include ingestion, dermal exposure, and inhalation.

Aflatoxin is an example of a mycotoxin. It is a cancer-causing poison produced by certain fungi in or on foods and feeds, especially in field corn and peanuts.

Toxic effects from mold were thought to be the result of exposure to the mycotoxins of some mold species, such as Stachybotrys chartarum. In 1927, Ismailson, a Soviet scientist, noted a form of mycotoxicosis in employees in a binder twine factory. In the 1940s, "Stachybotryotoxicosis" was identified in Ukraine as a new disease in humans in close contact with moldy hay, including inhalation of the associated dust, which caused, among other symptoms, a "haemorrhagic exúdate". Following cases of pulmonary hemorrhage in infants in Cleveland, Ohio in 1993–94, several related studies suggested a causal relationship between exposure to S. chartarum and the disease. An anonymous panel from within the CDC revisited the cases and argued that the link was not proven. Subsequent studies with mice and rats exposed to S. chartarum and associated mycotoxins showed that pulmonary hemorrhage could occur, suggesting the link is plausible. The American Academy of Pediatrics also found the link plausible, and subsequent analysis and case studies with humans have further noted the association. As well, a 1987 report by the United States Army Medical Research Institute of Infectious Diseases suggested that the effects of "trichothecene mycotoxins are more than 10 times greater via inhalation than via intravenous exposure." The presumed mechanism of action is that Stachybotrys produces a compound, stachylysin, which is a hemolysin that disintegrates (lyses) red blood cells.

Innate immune activation 
The health hazards produced by mold have been associated with sick building syndrome (SBS), but previously, controversy existed around whether studies had sufficiently demonstrated that indoor exposures to these common organisms posed a significant threat. In 1986, a study noted an airborne outbreak of toxicosis from trichothecenes associated with Stachybotrys atra in a Chicago house affecting a family including their maid; symptoms included diarrhea, headaches, fatigue, dermatitis, malaise, and severe leg pains, which resolved following remediation of the mold contamination. This study drew attention to how mycotoxins in indoor environments might impact health. In the early 2000s, several small studies concluded that individuals with significant dampness and mold exposure displayed cognitive and neurological deficits on par with mild-to-moderate traumatic brain injury along with immunological changes. These studies were criticised for their methodologies, such as by not showing a possible mechanism of action for the harm, and not controlling for the possibility of malingering by mold-exposed individuals involved in litigation, although the associated critiques were also problematic. Researchers also contested whether the amount of spores that could be breathed in by humans would be sufficient to cause a toxic effect and that no association between spore counts and adverse health effects existed. However, when also considering spore fragments (that have more surface area to carry mycotoxins) as well as whole spores, the amount of exposure was estimated to be 1,000x to 1,000,000x higher than previously thought. Moreover, inhalational exposure "provides a pathway to the central nervous system along the olfactory and trigeminal nerve axons in the nasal sensory epithelium that bypasses the blood–brain barrier."

Despite these early studies, a 2003 position paper by the American College of Occupational and Environmental Medicine (ACOEM) claimed the link between mold and building-related symptoms was "weak and unproven". Further to this, the Center for Legal Policy at the Manhattan Institute paid $40,000 to Globaltox (later, Veritox), a company associated with two of the same authors of the ACOEM paper, to produce a "lay translation" of their study that would be "more assessable ... to judges". This lay paper claimed that the notion that human health could be adversely affected by inhaled molds or their toxins was "junk science" and was referenced in legal cases in the United States to deny related legal claims. The United States Chamber of Commerce, the largest lobbying group in the U.S., also promoted this paper (and is still doing so as of 2020).

A 2006 position paper by the American Academy of Allergy, Asthma, and Immunology (AAAAI) maintained a similarly sceptical position as the ACOEM paper in denying that mold in indoor environments could cause severe effects. 
In 2008, the United States Government Accountability Office published a report on indoor mold, reviewing the literature to date and acknowledging the possibility of immune and toxic effects, while calling for further research. By 2009, the WHO noted a strong association between dampness and inflammatory responses, while also recognising that "synergistic interactions among microbial agents" might make it "difficult to detect and implicate specific exposures in the causation of damp building-associated adverse health effects." Gram-negative bacteria, which create endotoxins known to produce inflammatory responses, might also be partly responsible, as might actinomycetes and their associated exotoxins. While it may be difficult to determine the relative contributions of the molds, bacteria, and dust particles to which people are exposed, studies clearly show that such combinations activate stronger, synergistic immune responses than predicted by adding the effects of the individual stimuli.

Later in 2009, a carefully controlled, seminal study published by Kilburn demonstrated that mold exposure was associated with extensive adverse effects on multiple physiological systems. He compared the responses of 105 mold-exposed individuals to those of 202 unexposed controls, as well as those of 100 people exposed to a wide variety of chemicals. Rather than asking people how they felt, Kilburn measured physiological and mental function. He found highly significant abnormalities in the responses of mold-exposed individuals compared to controls on 12 of the 14 physiological functions quantified and 10 of the 13 psychological tests administered. These abnormalities included extreme problems with balance correlated with cerebellar abnormalities, decreased grip strength, impaired color vision, impaired visual fields, slowed reaction times, slowed performance on perceptual motor tasks, impaired memory, and decreased performance on problem-solving tasks as well as a variety of respiratory problems. Chemical-exposed individuals had similar abnormalities.

Like many researchers, Kilburn attributed the adverse effects of mold exposure primarily to the toxins some molds produce. Currently available data suggest mold's effects are more the result of chronic activation of the immune system, leading to chronic inflammation. Such immune activation does not necessarily require toxin exposure; rather, exposure to non-toxic mold stimuli or fungal skeletal elements is sufficient to activate immune responses and trigger inflammation. Nineteen innate-immune pattern-recognition receptors have been identified that recognize common components of fungal cell walls or fungal RNA/DNA, activating inflammatory responses. Studies exposing mice to controlled doses of S. chartarum spores show activation of the innate immune system, along with neural, cognitive, and emotional dysfunction, even when mycotoxins were removed and mice were exposed only to spore skeletal elements.

In 2012, a ten-year longitudinal study found that dampness and mold seemed to be an underlying cause of sick building syndrome. A 2018 review of 16 associated studies, including Kilburn's, concluded that people exposed to molds and mycotoxins had "symptoms affecting multiple organs, including the lungs, musculoskeletal system, as well as the central and peripheral nervous systems" and also noted that such exposure has now been implicated in the pathogenesis of autism-spectrum disorder. An in vitro study of human neurological system cells showed damage caused by inflammatory and immune processes (along with disruption of the blood-brain barrier) in response to mycotoxins at exposure levels that would be expected in water-damaged buildings. Ex vivo studies of human peripheral blood mononuclear cells showed inflammatory and innate immune responses upon exposure to specific molds and mycotoxins, such as S. chartarum (and an associated mycotoxin, Satratoxin G) and various strains of Aspergillus. Furthermore, children living in water-damaged homes show systemic inflammation, immune activation, and probably poorer cognitive function, too. Tellingly, many of the affected biomarkers, hormones, and pathways in individuals affected by inhaled mycotoxins are consistent with studies of ingested mycotoxins, such as trichothecene exposure.

The WHO estimates the prevalence of significant dampness and mold in buildings to be at least 20%, while other estimates of US homes suggest a prevalence as high as 47%. Sleeping disorders are also associated with exposure to dampness and mold, consistent with the decrease in α-melanocyte stimulating hormone (α-MSH) associated with this syndrome. Patients may also present with psychological symptoms given the neuroinflammatory markers and growth factors involved.

Exposure sources and prevention 
The primary sources of mold exposure are from the indoor air in buildings with substantial mold growth and the ingestion of food with mold growths.

Air

While mold and related microbial agents can be found both inside and outside, specific factors can lead to significantly higher levels of these microbes, creating a potential health hazard. Several notable factors are water damage in buildings, the use of building materials which provide a suitable substrate and source of food to amplify mold growth, relative humidity, and energy-efficient building designs, which can prevent proper circulation of outside air and create a unique ecology in the built environment. A common issue with mold hazards in the household can be the placement of furniture, resulting in a lack of ventilation of the nearby wall. The simplest method of avoiding mold in a home so affected is to move the furniture in question.

Prevention of mold exposure and its ensuing health issues begins with the prevention of mold growth in the first place by avoiding a mold-supporting environment. Extensive flooding and water damage can support extensive mold growth.

It is useful to perform an assessment of the location and extent of the mold hazard in a structure. Various practices of remediation can be followed to mitigate mold issues in buildings, the most important of which is to reduce moisture levels. Removal of affected materials after the source of moisture has been reduced and/or eliminated may be necessary, as some materials cannot be remediated. Thus, the concept of mold growth, assessment, and remediation is essential in preventing health issues arising due to the presence of dampness and mold.

Molds may excrete liquids or low-volatility gases, but the concentrations are so low that frequently they cannot be detected even with sensitive analytical sampling techniques. Sometimes, these by-products are detectable by odor, in which case they are referred to as "ergonomic odors", meaning the odors are noticeable but do not indicate toxicologically significant exposures.

Food

Molds that are often found on meat and poultry include members of the genera Alternaria, Aspergillus, Botrytis, Cladosporium, Fusarium, Geotrichum, Mortierella, Mucor, Neurospora, Paecilomyces, Penicillium, and Rhizopus.  Grain crops in particular incur considerable losses both in field and storage due to pathogens, post-harvest spoilage, and insect damage. A number of common microfungi are important agents of post-harvest spoilage, notably members of the genera Aspergillus, Fusarium, and Penicillium. A number of these produce mycotoxins (soluble, non-volatile toxins produced by a range of microfungi that demonstrate specific and potent toxic properties on human and animal cells) that can render foods unfit for consumption. When ingested, inhaled, or absorbed through skin, mycotoxins may cause or contribute to a range of effects from reduced appetite and general malaise to acute illness or death in rare cases. Mycotoxins may also contribute to cancer. Dietary exposure to the mycotoxin aflatoxin B1, commonly produced by growth of the fungus Aspergillus flavus on improperly stored ground nuts in many areas of the developing world, is known to independently (and synergistically with Hepatitis B virus) induce liver cancer. Mycotoxin-contaminated grain and other food products have a significant impact on human and animal health globally. According to the World Health Organization, roughly 25% of the world's food may be contaminated by mycotoxins.

Prevention of mold exposure from food is generally to consume food that has no mold growths on it. Also, mold growth in the first place can be prevented by the same concept of mold growth, assessment, and remediation that prevents air exposure. Also, it is especially useful to clean the inside of the refrigerator and to ensure dishcloths, towels, sponges, and mops are clean.

Ruminants are considered to have increased resistance to some mycotoxins, presumably due to the superior mycotoxin-degrading capabilities of their gut microbiota.  The passage of mycotoxins through the food chain may also have important consequences on human health. For example, in China in December 2011, high levels of carcinogen aflatoxin M1 in Mengniu brand milk were found to be associated with the consumption of mold-contaminated feed by dairy cattle.

Bedding
Bacteria, fungi, allergens, and particle-bound semi-volatile organic compounds (SVOCs) can all be found in bedding and pillows with possible consequences for human health given the high amount of exposure each day. Over 47 species of fungi have been identified in pillows, although the typical range of species found in a single pillow varied between four and sixteen. Compared to feather pillows, synthetic pillows typically display a slightly greater variety of fungal species and significantly higher levels of β‐(1,3)‐glucan, which can cause inflammatory responses. The authors concluded that these and related results suggest feather bedding might be a more appropriate choice for asthmatics than synthetics. Some newer bedding products incorporate silver nanoparticles due to their antibacterial, antifungal, and antiviral properties; however, the long-term safety of this additional exposure to these nanoparticles is relatively unknown, and a conservative approach to the use of these products is recommended.

Flooding 
Flooding in houses causes a unique opportunity for mold growth, which may be attributed to adverse health effects in people exposed to the mold, especially children and adolescents. In a study on the health effects of mold exposure after hurricanes Katrina and Rita, the predominant types of mold were Aspergillus, Penicillium, and Cladosporium with indoor spore counts ranging from 6,142 – 735,123 spores m−3. Molds isolated following flooding were different from mold previously reported for non-water damaged homes in the area. Further research found that homes with greater than three feet of indoor flooding demonstrated significantly higher levels of mold than those with little or no flooding.

Mitigation 

Recommended strategies to prevent mold include avoiding mold-contamination; utilization of environmental controls; the use of personal protective equipment (PPE), including skin and eye protection and respiratory protection; and environmental controls such as ventilation and suppression of dust.  When mold cannot be prevented, the CDC recommends clean-up protocol including first taking emergency action to stop water intrusion. Second, they recommend determining the extent of water damage and mold contamination. And third, they recommend planning remediation activities such as establishing containment and protection for workers and occupants; eliminating water or moisture sources if possible; decontaminating or removing damaged materials and drying any wet materials; evaluating whether space has been successfully remediated; and reassembling the space to control sources of moisture.

History 
In 1698, the physician Sir John Floyer published the first edition of A Treatise of the Asthma, the first English textbook on the malady. In it, he describes how dampness and mold could trigger an asthmatic attack, specifically, "damp houses and fenny [boggy] countries". He also writes of an asthmatic "who fell into a violent fit by going into a Wine-Cellar", presumably due to the "fumes" in the air.

In the 1930s, mold was identified as the cause behind the mysterious deaths of farm animals in Russia and other countries. Stachybotrys chartarum was found growing on the wet grain used for animal feed.  Illness and death also occurred in humans when starving peasants ate large quantities of rotten food grains and cereals heavily overgrown with the Stachybotrys mold.

In the 1970s, building construction techniques changed in response to changing economic realities, including the energy crisis. As a result, homes, and buildings became more airtight.  Also, cheaper materials such as drywall came into common use. The newer building materials reduced the drying potential of the structures, making moisture problems more prevalent.  This combination of increased moisture and suitable substrates contributed to increased mold growth inside buildings.

In April 2015, a tree fell on the home of Lucy Wicks, a Federal Liberal MP of Australia, causing water damage. Afterwards, she fell ill with neurological symptoms, environmental sensitivity, and fatigue, and was eventually diagnosed with chronic inflammatory response syndrome (CIRS) (see Innate immune activation). This led to a federal inquiry into biotoxin-related illnesses in 2018. It is currently unclear if the Department of Health have made any changes to the Australian healthcare system in response to the Inquiry and subsequent report. But the Australian Government formally responded to the recommendations made by the inquiry in March 2020, and the National Construction Code was updated in 2019 to implement higher standards regarding condensation management in building design.

As of 2020, the US Centers for Disease Control and Prevention (CDC) are yet to acknowledge or warn the public of the multi-system, chronic inflammatory, and innate immune system effects that can occur from exposure to dampness, mold, and water-damaged buildings.

Today, the US Food and Drug Administration and the agriculture industry closely monitor mold and mycotoxin levels in grains and foodstuffs to keep the contamination of animal feed and human food supplies below specific levels. In 2005, Diamond Pet Foods, a US pet food manufacturer, experienced a significant rise in the number of corn shipments containing elevated levels of aflatoxin. This mold toxin eventually made it into the pet food supply, and dozens of dogs and cats died before the company was forced to recall affected products.

In November 2022, a UK coroner recorded that a two year old child, Awaab Ishak from Rochdale, England, died in 2020 of "acute airway oedema with severe granulomatous tracheobronchitis due to environmental mould exposure" in his home.  The finding led to a 2023 change in UK law, known as “Awaab’s Law”, which will require social housing providers to remedy reported damp and mould within certain time limits.

Litigation
In 1999, an Austin, Texas, woman was awarded $32 million when she sued her insurer over mold damage in her 22-room mansion.

In 2001, a jury awarded a couple and their eight-year-old son $2.7 million, plus attorney's fees and costs, in a toxic mold-related personal injury lawsuit against the owners and managers of their apartment in Sacramento, California.

In 2002, the U.S. International Trade Commission reported that, according to one estimate, US insurers paid over $3 billion in mold-related lawsuits, more than double the previous year's total.

In 2003, there were over 10,000 mold-related lawsuits pending in US state courts according to the Insurance Information Institute. Most were filed in states with high humidity, but suits were on the rise in other states as well. Notably that year, The Tonight Show co-host Ed McMahon received $7.2 million from insurers and others to settle his lawsuit alleging that toxic mold in his Beverly Hills home made him and his wife ill and killed their dog. Also that year, environmental activist Erin Brockovich received settlements of $430,000 from two parties and an undisclosed amount from a third party to settle her lawsuit alleging toxic mold in her Agoura Hills, California, home.

By 2004, many mold litigation settlements were for amounts well past $100,000.

In 2005, the U.S. International Trade Commission reported that toxic mold showed signs of being the "new asbestos" in terms of claims paid.

In 2006, a Manhattan Beach, California, family received a $22.6 million settlement in a toxic mold case. The family had asserted that moldy lumber had caused severe medical problems in their child.  That same year, Hilton Hotels received $25 million in settlement of its lawsuit over mold growth in the Hilton Hawaiian Village's Kalia Tower.

In 2010, a jury awarded $1.2 million in damages in a lawsuit against a landlord for neglecting to repair a mold-infested house in Laguna Beach, California. The lawsuit asserted that a child in the home had severe respiratory problems for several years as a result of the mold.

In 2011, in North Pocono, Pennsylvania, a jury awarded two homeowners $4.3 million in a toxic mold verdict.

In 2012, a key appellate court in Manhattan found a consensus in the scientific literature for a causal relationship between the presence of mold and resultant illness.

Policy 
While there is a national policy in the United States regarding mold, each state is responsible for independently creating and administering its policy. For example, following Hurricane Harvey, the governor of Texas sought to expand the emergency response to allow mold-remediation companies to come from out of state.

Under Section 17920.3 of the California Health & Safety Code, visible mold growth and dampness of habitable rooms can be sufficient for a home to be declared as a "substandard building", offering legal recourse for those affected, such as tenants in moldy apartments. Notably, California recognizes by law not only that dampness and mold exacerbate asthma but can cause its development.

See also 

 Environmental engineering
 Environmental health
 Occupational asthma
 Occupational safety and health

References

Further reading

External links 
 CDC.gov Mold
 US EPA: Mold Information – U.S. Environmental Protection Agency
 US EPA: EPA Publication #402-K-02-003 "A Brief Guide to Mold, Moisture, and Your Home"
 NIBS: Whole Building Design Guide: Air Decontamination
 NPIC: Mold Pest Control Information – National Pesticide Information Center
 Mycotoxins in grains and the food supply:
 indianacrop.org
 cropwatch.unl.edu
 agbiopubs.sdstate.edu (PDF)
 

Building biology
Fungi and humans
Environmental engineering
Toxic effects of substances chiefly nonmedicinal as to source
Industrial hygiene
Building defects
Environmental law
Product liability
Occupational safety and health